Orhan Aydın Hacıyev (born 1 October 1989) is an Azerbaijani professional basketball player who currently plays for Semt77 Yalovaspor of the Turkish Basketball First League. He plays the power forward position. He is 2.03 m tall. He is member of Azerbaijan national basketball team. He also holds a Turkish citizenship.

References

External links
TBLStat.net Profile
Eurobasket2013.org Profile

1989 births
Living people
Aliağa Petkim basketball players
Azerbaijani emigrants to Turkey
Azerbaijani men's basketball players
Azerbaijani expatriate basketball people in Turkey
Basketball players at the 2015 European Games
Darüşşafaka Basketbol players
European Games competitors for Azerbaijan
Galatasaray S.K. (men's basketball) players
Gaziantep Basketbol players
Pertevniyal S.K. players
Power forwards (basketball)
Sportspeople from Baku
Türk Telekom B.K. players
Turkish men's basketball players
Turkish people of Azerbaijani descent
Uşak Sportif players
Yalovaspor BK players